Coriolopsis is a genus of fungi in the family Polyporaceae. It was circumscribed by American mycologist William Alphonso Murrill in 1905. The genus is cosmopolitan, with most species in tropical areas. The generic name combines the name Coriolus with the Ancient Greek word  ("appearance").

Species
, Index Fungorum accepts 21 species of Coriolopsis:

Coriolopsis albobadia (Lloyd) T.Hatt. & Sotome (2013)
Coriolopsis antleroides Douanla-Meli & Ryvarden (2007)
Coriolopsis badia (Berk.) Murrill (1907) – Philippines, Sierra Leone
Coriolopsis bataanensis Murrill (1908)
Coriolopsis brunneoleuca (Berk.) Ryvarden (1972) – Australia
Coriolopsis burchellii (Berk. ex Cooke) Ryvarden (1988)
Coriolopsis byrsina (Mont.) Ryvarden (1972)
Coriolopsis daedaleoides (Berk.) Ryvarden (1972) – Papua New Guinea
Coriolopsis fumosa Murrill (1912)
Coriolopsis gallica (Fr.) Ryvarden (1973) – Africa, Europe, North America
Coriolopsis helvola (Fr.) Ryvarden (1972) – Sierra Leone
Coriolopsis luteo-olivacea (Berk.) Teng (1963)
Coriolopsis luteola (X.Q.Zhang & J.D.Zhao) J.D.Zhao (1989) – China
Coriolopsis occidentalis (Klotzsch) Murrill (1905) – Africa, Asia, South America
Coriolopsis phaea (Lév.) Teng (1963)
Coriolopsis phocina (Berk. & Broome) Murrill (1907)
Coriolopsis pruinata (Klotzsch) Teng (1963) – Mauritius
Coriolopsis suberosifusca (Corner) T.Hatt. & Sotome (2013)
Coriolopsis taylorii Murrill (1908)
Coriolopsis tuberculata Ryvarden (2000)
Coriolopsis turgida (Lloyd) Teng)1963)

References

External links

Polyporaceae
Polyporales genera
Taxa named by William Alphonso Murrill
Taxa described in 1905